Diplosentidae is a family of parasitic worms from the order Echinorhynchida.

Taxonomy

The family Diplosentidae  was established by Tubangui and Masiluñgan in 1937 based on Diplosentis amphacanthi. The family now contains six genera divided into two subfamilies. The family is characterised by the absence of trunk spines, the presence of just two cement glands, heavily coiled lemnisci said to be enclosed in a membranous sac and similar hooks on the proboscis.

Golvan, in 1969, placed Pararhadinorhynchus in the Diplosentinae because they had two cement glands and no trunk spines. Golvan also created in 1969 the Allorhadinorhynchinae based on Allorhadinorhynchus for diplosentids with two cement glands and trunk spines. Subsequently, Noronha et al. in 1978, added Golvanorhynchus, Amin and Sey in 1996 added Slendrorhynchus and Salgado-Maldonado and Santos added Amapacanthus in 2000 all within the Allorhadinorhynchinae subfamily.

However, two of these genera (Golvanorhynchus and Slendrorhynchus) has modified the concept of the family to include genera with more than two cement glands. The type species of Allorhadinorhynchus, A. segmentatum was described by Yamaguti in 1959 as having only two cement glands but Araki and Machida in 1987 showed that this species has four cement glands. They proposed the new combination of Micracanthorhynchina segmentata which implies membership of the Rhadinorhynchidae. As a result, they synonymised Allorhadinorhynchus with Micracanthorhynchina. This action also had significance for the subfamily Allorhadinorhynchinae which should have fallen into synonymy, however, this has not been commented on by any authors. Despite this well-argued action, Amin and Sey in 1996 did not recognise the new combination proposed by Araki and Machida in 1987, stating without argumentation that it was “invalid”. Thus the family has little morphological integrity.

Species
Arhythmacanthidae has 2 subfamilies (Allorhadinorhynchinae and Diplosentinae) and the following species:

Allorhadinorhynchinae Golvan, 1969
Allorhadinorhynchus Yamaguti, 1959
 Allorhadinorhynchus segmentatum Yamaguti, 1959
A. segmentatum is the only species and thus the type species of the genus Allorhadinorhynchus. It parasitizes the Japanese halfbeak (Hyporhamphus sajori).

Diplosentinae Tubangui and Masiluñgan, 1937
Amapacanthus Salgado-Maldonado & Santos, 2000
Amapacanthus amazonicus Salgado-Maldonado & Santos, 2000
A. amazonicus parasitizes the Passany sea catfish (Sciades passany reported as the synonym Arius passany) and the Foureyes (Anableps microleps).

Diplosentis Tubangui & Masilungan, 1937
Diplosentis amphacanthi Tubangui & Masilungan, 1937
D. amphacanthi was collected in the Philippines from the White-spotted spinefoot (Siganus canaliculatus but reported as the synonym Amphacanthus oramin) which occurs widely in the tropical Indo-Pacific.
Diplosentis manteri Gupta & Fatma, 1979
D. manteri was described from a single specimen from the Threadfin sea catfish (Arius arius) in India.

Pararhadinorhynchus Johnston and Edmonds, 1947
Pararhadinorhynchus coorongensis Edmonds, 1973
P. coorongensis was found parasitizing the Yellow-eye mullet (Aldrichetta forsteri).
Pararhadinorhynchus mugilis Johnston and Edmonds, 1947
It is commonly found parasitizing the Flathead grey mullet (Mugil cephalus). 
Pararhadinorhynchus upenei Wang, Wang and Wu, 1993
P. upenei was found parasitizing the Sulphur goatfish (Upeneus sulphureus).

Hosts
Diplosentidae species parasitize fish hosts.

Notes

References

Diplosentidae Meyer, 1932 at the World Register of Marine Species web-site

Echinorhynchida
Acanthocephala families